Acepentalene is a tricyclic anti-aromatic compound. It consists of three five-membered rings fused across three of the five carbon atoms. The central carbon atom in acepentalene is part of all three rings. There are formally five double bonds in acepentalene, so that the molecule formally contains four double bonds on the exterior, and one double bond from the central carbon to the exterior of the ring system.

The acepentalene dianion, which can be stabilized by two lithium atoms, is more stable. The radical anion is also known.

The dianion was first synthesized by reacting triquinacene with n-butyllithium and potassium tert-amylate (also called potassium t-pentoxide) in hexane solution.

References

Antiaromatic compounds